Irles is a commune in the Somme department in Hauts-de-France in northern France.

Geography

History
Irles was the site of an action by the 1st Royal West Kent Regiment and the 12th Gloucestershire Regiment on 23 August 1918 during the Second Battle of Bapaume.

Population

See also
Communes of the Somme department

References
Major CV Maloney, '"Invicta": with the 1st Battalion the Queen's Own Royal West Kent Regiment in the Great War', London: Nisbet & Co, 1923. 

Communes of Somme (department)